Aram Kiptalam Keter (1932 – 3 December 2013) was a Kenyan sprinter. He competed in the men's 4 × 400 metres relay at the 1956 Summer Olympics in Melbourne, Australia. He also finished sixth in the men's 4 x 440 yards relay in the 1958 British Empire and Commonwealth Games, in Cardiff, Wales.

References

1932 births
2013 deaths
Athletes (track and field) at the 1954 British Empire and Commonwealth Games
Athletes (track and field) at the 1956 Summer Olympics
Kenyan male sprinters
Kenyan male middle-distance runners
Olympic athletes of Kenya
Place of birth missing
Commonwealth Games competitors for Kenya